Cognitive description is a term used in psychology to describe the cognitive workings of the human mind.

A cognitive description specifies what information is utilized during a cognitive action, how this information is processed and transformed, what data structures are used, and what behaviour is generated.

See also

 Cognitive module

References

Behavioural sciences
Cognition
Evolutionary psychology
Ethology
Semantics